This is a list of notable restaurants in Iceland.

Restaurants in Iceland

 Hótel Búðir – hotel that originally opened as a guesthouse and fish restaurant. The hotel was completely destroyed by a fire on February 21, 2001, and now has 28 bedrooms and a restaurant that seats 80 people.
 Dill – New Nordic cuisine restaurant in Reykjavík
 Perlan – landmark building in Reykjavík. The top (fifth) floor (fifth floor) of Perlan houses a restaurant Út í bláinn and a café Kaffitár
 ROK  – A seafood restaurant in Reykjavík owned by the notable Icelandic actor, Magnús Scheving and his wife, Hrefna Björk Sverrisdóttir 
 Serrano – chain of Tex Mex restaurants in Iceland and in Stockholm, Sweden
A.Hansen – A steakhouse located in Hafnarfjörður in a historic building built in 1880
 Tommi's Burger Joint
 Hamborgarafabrikkan

See also
 Icelandic cuisine
 List of companies of Iceland
 List of Icelandic brands
 Lists of restaurants

References

External links
 

Restaurants
Iceland